The North-Link Line is the central section of the Eastern Line of the Taiwan Railways Administration.  The length of its mainline is 79.2 km, and there is a 7.4 km long branch between Beipu and Hualien Port.

History 
The high mountains and cliffs in eastern Taiwan, between Yilan and Hualien, is a major barrier to the transportation between northern Taiwan and eastern Taiwan. The highway was narrow and dangerous. Ferry service between Keelung and Hualien was an overnight trip. Thus in 1973 the construction of North-link line started. The line branched from Yilan line at Nan Sheng Hu in Su'ao, traveling through mountains and valleys with 91 tunnels and 16 bridges, and ended at a newly constructed Hualien Station. The line was completed in 1979 and was almost immediately overloaded in passenger and freight services. Despite Taiwan Railways Administration continued upgrading signals, tracks, and rolling stock of the line, the great demand could not be fulfilled. The line was then electrified in 2003 and expanded to two tracks (double track) in January 2005.

Stations 

 Yongchun Station: Located between Su'aoxin and Yongle. Merged by Yongle Station in 2002.

See also 
Ten Major Construction Projects

References 

1980 establishments in Taiwan
TRA routes
Railway lines opened in 1980
3 ft 6 in gauge railways in Taiwan